The CAF Women's Champions League, sometimes abbreviated as CAF WCL, is an annual international women's association football club competition in Africa organized by the Confederation of African Football, involving the continent's top women's club teams. It is the female counterpart of the CAF Champions League.

History
CAF cancelled the 2020 Women's Africa Cup of Nations at a virtual executive meeting on 30 June citing the impact of the COVID-19 pandemic on association football in Africa as the reason and rather approved the creation of the CAF Women's Champions League. This tournament was launched on 12 September that year. South Africa's Mamelodi Sundowns beat Hasaacas Ladies of Ghana 2-0 as they made history and won the first ever Women's African Champions League title in Cairo.

On 18 April 2022, CAF issued a press release to its member associations wishing to engage their domestic league champions in the qualification procedures for the upcoming edition to submit viable club licensing documents to them by 31 May 2022. The second edition witnessed AS FAR of Morocco, crowned champions after defeating Mamelodi Sundowns 4-0 in the final.

Sponsorship 
This tournament uses the same sponsors as other major CAF competitions, including the CAF Champions League.

Format
The format for the first edition saw the champions of each of the six CAF zones play for a spot in the competition. They are joined by the hosts and an extra team from the zone of the defending/reigning/current Women's Africa Cup of Nations champions (for the inaugural edition only). The tournament is currently played in two groups of four teams. Since the 2022 edition, the spot reserved for the additional team from the CAF sub-region of the incumbent Women's AFCON is given instead to this tournament's defending champions.

Prizes

2022 
In 2022, CAF introduced prize money for the eight participants in group stage for the first time in an African football club competition.

Results

Records and statistics

Winners by club

By nation

Performances by region

Awards

Most Valuable Player

Top scorers by tournament
The top scorer award is given for most goals in the main tournament phases.

See also
FIFA Women's Club World Cup
AFC Women's Club Championship
Copa Libertadores Femenina
UEFA Women's Champions League

Notes & references

Notes

References

External links
 

CAF Women's Champions League
Confederation of African Football club competitions
Women's association football competitions in Africa
Recurring sporting events established in 2020
2020 establishments in Africa
Multi-national professional sports leagues